A coastal waterfall is a waterfall that plunges directly into the sea. Another common name for this feature is a tidefall.

Notable coastal waterfalls

Coastal waterfalls include:
Waterfall Bay Falls, Hong Kong
Bowen Falls, Milford Sound, New Zealand
McWay Falls, Julia Pfeiffer Burns State Park, California
Alamere Falls, Point Reyes National Seashore, California
Hayburn Wyke, Scarborough, North Yorkshire, England
Lower Düden Waterfalls, Antalya, Turkey

See also
 List of waterfalls that empty into an ocean

References

Waterfalls
Coastal and oceanic landforms